The 1933 Cleveland Indians season was a season in American baseball. The team finished fourth in the American League with a record of 75–76, 23½ games behind the Washington Senators.

Regular season

Season standings

Record vs. opponents

Roster

Player stats

Batting

Starters by position 
Note: Pos = Position; G = Games played; AB = At bats; H = Hits; Avg. = Batting average; HR = Home runs; RBI = Runs batted in

Other batters 
Note: G = Games played; AB = At bats; H = Hits; Avg. = Batting average; HR = Home runs; RBI = Runs batted in

Pitching

Starting pitchers 
Note: G = Games pitched; IP = Innings pitched; W = Wins; L = Losses; ERA = Earned run average; SO = Strikeouts

Other pitchers 
Note: G = Games pitched; IP = Innings pitched; W = Wins; L = Losses; ERA = Earned run average; SO = Strikeouts

Relief pitchers 
Note: G = Games pitched; W = Wins; L = Losses; SV = Saves; ERA = Earned run average; SO = Strikeouts

Awards and honors 
All Star Game

Earl Averill, Outfielder

Wes Ferrell, Pitcher

Oral Hildebrand, Pitcher

Farm system 

LEAGUE CHAMPIONS: Zanesville

References

External links
1933 Cleveland Indians season at Baseball Reference

Cleveland Indians seasons
Cleveland Indians season
Cleveland Indians